Presidential elections are scheduled to be held in Russia in March 2024. In accordance with electoral law, the first round will be held on Sunday, 17 March. The elections will be the first after the 2020 amendments to the Constitution of Russia, incumbent President Vladimir Putin would be eligible to seek reelection. Russian newspaper Kommersant reported in January 2023 that preparation was underway for his election campaign. This was later denied by his spokesman. As of March 2023, Putin has not announced his intention to run for re-election. If no candidate receives more than half the vote, a second round will take place exactly three weeks later on 7 April 2024. The winner of the election is scheduled to be inaugurated on 7 May 2024.

As was the case in the 2018 Russian presidential election, one of the most prominent opposition leaders, Alexei Navalny, is barred from running due to a prior criminal conviction, which is widely seen by political analysts, jurists and human rights organizations as politically motivated. In addition, Navalny is currently serving a jail sentence that will be followed by another sentence which is set to expire in 2032, years after this election and the following election are set to take place.

Background

2020 constitutional reform

According to clause 3 of article 81 of the Constitution of Russia, the same person cannot hold the position of President of the Russian Federation for more than two terms. The constitutional reform confirmed this provision, and even removed the words "in a row", because there was actually no limit on the maximum number of terms and thanks to which Vladimir Putin again became President in 2012. However, at the same time, the number of terms previously held by the incumbent and former presidents has ceased to be taken into account, which is why Vladimir Putin will be elected again for two new terms.

New requirements for candidates
According to the new version of the Constitution, presidential candidates must:

Be at least 35 years old (the requirement has not changed);
Be resident in Russia for at least 25 years (previously 10 years);
Not have foreign citizenship or residence permit in a foreign country, either at the time of the election or at any time before (new constitutional requirement).

Individuals who have publicly expressed interest
Individuals in this section have expressed an interest in running for president.

United Russia
Maxim Oreshkin, former Minister of Economic Development.

Communist Party
Pavel Grudinin, CEO of the Lenin State Farm, former Deputy of the Moscow Oblast Duma, 2018 presidential candidate.

Liberal Democratic Party
Yelena Afanasyeva, Senator from Orenburg Oblast.

A Just Russia — For Truth
Oleg Bryachak, Deputy of the Pskov City Duma.

Yabloko
Oleg Vinogradov, former Vice Governor of Yaroslavl Oblast, former Deputy of the Yaroslavl Oblast Duma.
Nikolay Rybakov, leader of the Yabloko party.
Lev Schlossberg, Deputy of the Pskov Oblast Council of Deputies.

Party of Social Protection
Vladimir Mikhailov, Deputy of the Kostroma Oblast Duma, leader of the Party of Social Protection, entrepreneur and inventor.

Independent
, rapper.
Dmitri Nossov, sportsman, judoka and former Deputy of the State Duma.
Maxim Suraykin, Former Deputy of the Legislative Assembly of Ulyanovsk Oblast, former leader of the Communists of Russia, 2018 presidential candidate.
Boris Yakemenko, public activist and co-founder of the Nashi movement.

Potential candidates
Individuals in this section are the subject of speculation about their possible candidacy.

United Russia
Alexey Dyumin, Governor of Tula Oblast.
Dmitry Medvedev, leader of United Russia party, former Prime Minister of Russia and former President of Russia.
Dmitry Mironov, assistant to the President of Russia, former Governor of Yaroslavl Oblast.
Sergey Naryshkin, Director of the Foreign Intelligence Service, former Deputy and Chairman of the State Duma.
Alexander Novak, Deputy Prime Minister, former Minister of Energy.
Sergei Shoigu, Minister of Defence, former Governor of Moscow Oblast, former Minister of Emergency Situations.
Sergey Sobyanin, Mayor of Moscow.
Andrey Turchak, Senator from Pskov Oblast and First Deputy Chairman of the Federation Council, former Governor of Pskov Oblast.

Communist Party
 Yury Afonin, Deputy of the State Duma.
Nikolai Bondarenko, former Deputy of the Saratov Oblast Duma.
Leonid Kalashnikov, Deputy of the State Duma.
Andrey Klychkov, Governor of Oryol Oblast.
Nikolay Kolomeytsev, Deputy of the State Duma.
Alexey Kurinny, Deputy of the State Duma.
Anatoly Lokot, Mayor of Novosibirsk, former Deputy of the State Duma.
Oleg Mikhailov, Deputy of the State Duma.
Nikita Mikhalkov, filmmaker, actor, chairman of the Russian Cinematographers' Union.
Dmitry Novikov, Deputy of the State Duma.
Maria Prusakova, Deputy of the State Duma.
 Gennady Zyuganov, leader of the Communist Party, Deputy of the State Duma.

Liberal Democratic Party
Mikhail Degtyarev, Governor of Khabarovsk Krai, former Deputy of the State Duma.
Igor Lebedev, former Deputy of the State Duma.
Alexey Ostrovsky, Governor of Smolensk Oblast, former Deputy of the State Duma.
Leonid Slutsky, Leader of the Liberal Democratic Party, Deputy of the State Duma.

A Just Russia — For Truth
Zakhar Prilepin, writer, publicist, TV anchor, public activist, former leader of the For Truth party.

Yabloko
Dmitry Muratov, journalist, editor-in-chief of the Novaya Gazeta newspaper and 2021 Nobel Peace Prize laureate.

Independent
Andrey Belousov, First Deputy Prime Minister.
Kirill Dmitriev, CEO of the Russian Direct Investment Fund.
Sergey Kiriyenko, Kremlin First Deputy Chief of Staff and former Prime Minister of Russia.
Alexei Kudrin, Former Chairman of the Accounts Chamber, former Minister of Finace.
Mikhail Mishustin, Prime Minister of Russia.
Dmitry Patrushev, Minister of Agriculture.
Yevgeny Prigozhin, businessman, head of the Wagner Group.
Vladimir Putin, incumbent President, former Prime Minister of Russia, former Director of the Federal Security Service.

Declined to be candidates
The individuals in this section have publicly denied interest in running.

United Russia
Ramzan Kadyrov, Head of Chechnya.
Vyacheslav Volodin, Deputy and Chairman of the State Duma.

A Just Russia — For Truth 
Sergey Mironov, Leader of the A Just Russia — For Truth party, Deputy of the State Duma, Former Chairman of the Federation Council, presidential candidate in 2004 and 2012.

Yabloko 
Grigory Yavlinsky, former Deputy of the State Duma, former leader of the Yabloko party, presidential candidate in 1996, 2000 and 2018.

Independent
Maxim Galkin, comedian and TV anchor.

Disqualified candidates
This section contains candidates who expressed their intention to run or the most well-known potential candidates who have lost their right to run.

Independent
Alexei Navalny, Russian opposition leader and anti-corruption activist. He is barred from running in the election due to a prior criminal conviction, which is widely seen by political analysts, jurists and human rights organizations, as politically motivated. In addition, Navalny is currently serving a jail sentence that will be followed by another sentence which is set to expire in 2032, years after the election takes place.
Sergei Polonsky, businessman, former CEO of the Mirax Group. In 2013, he received Cambodian citizenship, and now does not have the right to become President of Russia, even if he renounces his foreign citizenship.
Ksenia Sobchak, TV anchor, opposition activist and journalist, Civic Initiative's presidential nominee in 2018. In 2022, she received Israeli citizenship, and now does not have the right to become President of Russia, even if she renounces her foreign citizenship.

Endorsements

Opinion polls

Notes

References

2024
2024 elections in Europe
2024 in Russia
Russia